The Phachi River is a river in western Thailand. It originates in the Tenasserim Hills in Ban Kha District and passes Suan Phueng and Chom Bueng districts, Ratchaburi Province. The river tributes to the Khwae Noi River in Mueang Kanchanaburi district, Kanchanaburi Province.

Phachi